Coffee and walnut cake is a sponge cake made with additional coffee, usually either instant coffee or Camp Coffee, and walnut pieces. The cake is often filled with flavoured butter icing and topped with more butter icing and walnut halves.

Coffee and walnut cakes are widely available in supermarkets in the United Kingdom. English food writer Nigel Slater has said it would be his final meal if he had a choice.

See also
 List of cakes

References

External links
 

British cakes
Cakes
Walnut dishes